The Courtneys II is the second studio album by Canadian band The Courtneys. It was released on February 17, 2017 through Flying Nun Records.

Accolades

Track listing

References

2017 albums
Flying Nun Records albums
The Courtneys albums